Belarusian cuisine shares many similarities with cuisines of other Eastern, Central
and Northeastern European countries, based predominantly on meat and various vegetables typical for the region.

History

Belarus cuisine has predominantly Slavic roots. Along with a Ruthenian influence, it  is also linked with Lithuanian and Polish because of the long intermingling of these three peoples; first within the Grand Duchy of Lithuania (11th-15th centuries) and later within the Polish–Lithuanian Commonwealth (16th-17th centuries). Though the Belarusian nobility, like the Polish elite, borrowed much from Italian, German, and French cuisines, this influence hardly made itself felt in the diet of the peasant majority. Still, some of the borrowed dishes spread throughout the society, such as lazanki (a mixture of flour dumplings and stewed meat, related to Italian lasagna) and, above all, various dishes made of grated potatoes, typical for German cuisine.

The political upheavals of the 20th century completely wiped out the former privileged classes and many traditional upper and middle class dishes went down the path of oblivion. The very idea of a separate Belarusian cuisine was treated with suspicion. Only after World War II did it occur to the communist authorities that the proclaimed ‘flourishing of national culture’ should also be evident in the cuisine. The only source permitted for such a culinary reconstruction was the heritage of the poorest peasants as of the 1880s, a time when primitive rural lifestyle was already on the wane. Chefs were instructed by the Party to create the new Belarusian cuisine from scratch. Dish names, recipes, "authentic" kitchenware – all were reinvented anew, as though ten centuries of history had never existed. Only the sudden advent of independence in 1991 brought an opportunity to restore these lost traditions, and a great deal still remains to be done here.

Modern Belarusian cuisine is still heavily influenced by its recent Soviet past, and many local restaurants feature Russian or Soviet dishes rather than true specialties of local cuisine. Some Belarusians may have more interest in Italian, Chinese, and Japanese cuisine than in their own culinary heritage. However, draniki (both plain and stuffed), boršč, chaładnik, mačanka, zrazy, cold meat rolls, eggs stuffed with mushrooms, hałubcy, fried raw pork sausage and bliny are likely to be found everywhere, as well as sour rye bread.

Meals
A traditional peasant or merchant's dinner consisted of just two dishes: soup and a main course. A special kind of pot, the sparysh, with two compartments, was used by farmers' children to bring lunch to their father working in the fields. Prior to World War II, salads or other snacks were not very common, and recipes based on Russian models tended to appear in modern Belarusian postwar cookbooks. Fresh white cheese and various kinds of cold meats (usually smoked) were available, however, at least on holidays.

Cereals
Since wheat does not grow well in a cold and wet climate, Belarusians were always fond of a kind of somewhat sour rye bread, and the most traditional hard drink, the local vodka or harelka, was distilled primarily from a rye malt.

Like other Slavic peoples, Belarusians could boast of a huge variety of bliny (pancakes) of various thickness, plain and filled, made mostly of wheat or buckwheat flour, but also using oatmeal (tsadaviki).

Various kinds of cereal especially barley, oatmeal and buckwheat were common. Belarus was the likely centre of Europe's buckwheat culture, and dishes made with this healthy grain used to be very popular: various kinds of buns, cakes and dumplings which, except for the well-known "kasha", no longer exist today.

Vegetables
The main vegetables were cabbage (often made into sauerkraut) and beets, while turnips, swedes, parsnip and carrots both stewed and boiled (with the addition of a small amount of milk) were somewhat less popular. As elsewhere in Europe, legumes were the main source of protein, mainly in the form of kamy (puree of peas or beans with melted lard).

Soups
The word soup was not known in Belarus until the 18th century when the nobility borrowed it from German, but soup as a type of dish clearly existed centuries earlier. The old word for most traditional Belarusian soups was poliŭka, except for those named after the vegetable that was the main ingredient: kapusta (cabbage soup), buraki (beet soup), gryžanka (swede soup). For a typical poliŭka the major ingredients (fish or mushrooms during fasts) were first boiled with spices; cereals such as barley or millet were boiled in the stock, and then flour blended with water, bread kvass, beet juice or buttermilk was added to the stock. Black poliŭka, made with goose or pork blood, is closely related to the Swedish "black soup" svartsoppa. Offering a matchmaker black poliŭka was the polite way for the bride's parents to decline a young man's proposal. Like the Ukrainians, Russians and Poles, Belarusians are fond of borscht, a thick and rich beet and cabbage soup made with grains, potato and meat. Soups are much more authentic, both hot (shchi, boršč, sorrel soup) and especially cold sour soups which provide cooling relief during the hot summer.

The Belarusian chaladnik, a cold borscht made of beets, beet leaves or sorrel and served with sour cream, hard-boiled eggs, and boiled potatoes, has been a popular dish also in Polish and Lithuanian cuisines since the late 18th century.

Meat

Meat was in rather scarce supply for most people, and was primarily eaten only on the main Christian holidays. Avid consumers of pork, Belarusians are less partial to mutton and beef. Most common was raw pork sausage – a pig intestine stuffed with minced or chopped meat seasoned with salt, pepper, and garlic. Its common name – "finger-stuffed sausage" ( or in short пальцоўка) – provided a graphic description of the primitive production technology. Kishkа, or kryvyanka, was a local blood sausage made of pig’s blood and buckwheat grain. Škalondza, or kindziuk, a particular kind of round sausage made of pig stomach filled with pork minced with spices – a relative of the Lithuanian skilandis – was known throughout the country. Borrowed from Italian cuisine by nobility in the 16th century, cold meat rolls, salcesons and balerons were common to all of society by the 19th century, and are still very popular. Smoked goose breast pauguski, a local Belarusian and Lithuanian delicacy, was once the pride of middle-class cuisine, but no longer exists today.

Veraščaka, an 18th-century thick meat gravy with pieces of meat and sausage used as a dip or sauce for thick pancakes, is still one of the most popular specialties of Belarusian restaurants today, although it is now generally called mačanka (a dip). Also popular are zrazy, chopped pieces of beef rolled into a sausage shape and filled with vegetable, mushroom, eggs, potato etc. Pork dishes are usually fried or stewed, garnished with cheese or mushrooms. Beef steaks are also quite frequent, but mutton, once very popular, is almost entirely limited to Caucasian or Central Asian restaurants, although still quite a few eat it today.

Dumplings
Kalduny, small boiled dumplings related to Russian pelmeni and Italian ravioli, were produced in endless combinations of dough, filling and sauce. Especially popular were kalduny Count Tyshkevich (filled with a mixture of fried local mushrooms and smoked ham). In the late 19th century kalduny began to be made with grated potato rather than with a flour-based dough and the former huge variety of fillings shrank considerably. Today, kalduny have to struggle vigorously to regain their former popularity, now overtaken by the Russian pelmeni.

Dairy foods
The main dairy foods include a kind of fresh white cheese and sour cream, which is widely used both in cooking and as a garnish. Only in the mid-19th century was fermented cheese borrowed from the Netherlands and Switzerland, and the local version of Edam was very popular for decades in the Russian Empire. Sour butter from the former Dzisna county was exported to Britain, where it continued to be the most expensive variety up to World War I. Today, however, these traditions have become a thing of the past.

Beverages

The traditional hard drink is vodka or harelka, including varieties made from birch sap (biarozavik) or flavored with forest herbs (zubrovka). Mead and similar alcoholic drinks made of honey and spices were very common up until the 19th century and then more or less disappeared until the latest  revival of the national cuisine. A notable example in this group is krambambula, vodka diluted with water, mixed with honey, and flavored with spices (nutmeg, cinnamon, cloves, red and black pepper). In the 18th century this drink competed with French champagne in Belarus and only wealthy people could afford it. Today it is enjoying a popular revival, as is evident from the appearance of krambambula recipes and histories on the Internet.

Kvass traditionally was and still remains the main local non-alcoholic drink, although it is increasingly made with sugars and artificial flavorings rather than with genuine rye malt and natural flavorings. Kompot is also a relatively popular beverage, normally made of dried or fresh fruit, boiled, and then cooled. Every small town boasts a local variety of mineral water. Belarusians prefer carbonated water.

Тraditional liquid desserts that accompany a meal include saladucha, a thick liquid made of rye flour and honey that was popular in the 18th century, and kissel, the traditional jelly drink of Eastern Europe made from the pulp of forest berries or cooked fruits, originally thickened with oatmeal (now replaced by potato starch flour or cornstarch).

Minority cuisines

Belarusian cuisine owes much to Jewish cooking. In the 19th century, Jewish influence was especially noticeable in bringing in potato dishes of German origin, such as babka. This was a two-way gastronomic street, for the famous bulbe latkes, the potato pancakes of the East European Jews, may have been borrowed from the Belarusian draniki.

Another important minority ethnic group which influenced Belarusian cuisine were the Lipka Tatars, whose Tatar cuisine was especially strong in various cakes with fillings, mutton and vegetable dishes.

Potatoes
The potato became so common in the 19th century – there are some 300+ dishes recorded in Belarus – that it came to be considered the core of the national cuisine. In the Russian Empire and Soviet Union, Belarusians were sometimes called bulbashi, a pejorative conjugation of the Belarusian word for potato.

Salads
Typical salads are made of a fairly short list of ingredients, combining boiled beef or chicken, potato, beet, carrot, apple, herring, diced cheese, canned peas and corn, canned fish, ‘crab fingers’, onions and mushrooms, generously seasoned with mayonnaise or sunflower oil. One of the most typical local salads is the "Belaya Vezha" salad (named after the Belaya Vezha Forest), which combines boiled chicken meat with fried mushrooms, onions, and pickled cucumbers, mixed with mayonnaise and garnished with chopped hard-boiled egg. Fresh vegetable salads are also widely available: tomatoes (also mixed with cucumbers) and onions seasoned with sour cream; radishes with dill and sunflower oil (or sour cream); shredded cabbage salad seasoned with sunflower oil or mayonnaise (similar to coleslaw); and pickled cabbage with caraway seeds or cranberries with onions seasoned with sunflower oil are common.

Fish
Historically, Belarusians had little access to seafood, and this is still evident in the cuisine. The most common sea fish (after herring, which has been the most common appetizer all along the Baltic coast and its vicinity ever since the 14th century) are hake and cod and there are relatively few dishes with such fish. Much more traditional and common are lake fish, notably zander, cooked in a wide variety of ways, and carp (especially the famous stuffed carp, the gefilte fish of Jewish cuisine). Eels, smoked or stuffed, are the specialty of the lake country in the northwestern part of Belarus, adjacent to Latvia and Lithuania.

Side dishes
Side dishes are usually boiled, fried or mashed potatoes, buckwheat kasha, rice or pasta. Meat dishes are frequently served with bliny or draniki stacked in round clay pots.

References

Further reading
 Dembińska M. Konsumcja zywnościowa w Polsce średniowiecznhej. Wrocław, 1963
 Kuchowicz Z. Obyczaje staropolskie XVII-XVIII ww. Łódź, 1975
 Lemnis M., Vitry H. W staropolskiej kuchni i przy polskim stole. Warsawa, 1979
 Kowecka E. W salonie i w kuchni. Warsawa, 1989
 Похлебкин В. Национальные кухни наших народов. М.,1991
 Литовская кухня. Мн.,1991
 Белорусская кухня. Мн.,1993
 Літоўская гаспадыня. Мн.,1993
 Зайкоўскі Э.М., Тычка Г.К. Старадаўняя беларуская кухня. Мн.,1995
 Puronas V. Nuo mamutų iki cepelinų. Vilnius, 1999
 Навагродскі Т. Традыцыі народнага харчавання беларусаў. Мн.,2000
 Белы А. In laudem cerevisiae (на хвалу піва). Спадчына. 2000. No. 1
 Bockenheim K. Przy polskim stole. Wrocław, 2003
 Fiedoruk A. Kuchnia podlaska w rozhoworach i recepturach opisana. Białystok, 2003
 Вялікае княства Літоўскае: Энцыклапедыя. У 2 т. Т.1. Мн.:БелЭн,2005. 
 Bely, Alexander. The Belarusian Cookbook. NY, 2009. 
Национальная кухня России

External links

Cuisine of Belarus on the official website of the Republic of Belarus 
Tasty Belarus
Belarusian cuisine dishes